Yulin Township is a township under the administration of Mingshui County, Heilongjiang, China. , it has 7 villages under its administration.

References 

Township-level divisions of Heilongjiang
Mingshui County